A Minor Bird is the debut album for the side project of Eisley member Stacy DuPree King, her husband and drummer for Mutemath Darren King, and Jeremy Larson. The album was produced at Jeremy Larson's studio in Springfield, Missouri.

Release
It was initially issued on CD, vinyl, and digitally in a "Limited Edition Red Velvet Package". The package included one vinyl, access to a downloadable version of the album via email, an instant download of the single "When We Were Young", one 18x24 Paper Doll Poster, four 4x6 Sucré Lyric Prints, one Sucré Art Print, and a Tote Bag.

Track listing

Personnel
Stacy King - Performer
Darren King - Performer, producer
Jeremy Larson - Performer, engineer, mixer
Sarah Reno - French horn, trumpet, tenor horn (1, 4-8, 10, 11)
Artwork by Ryan Strong
Photography by Elsie Larson

References

External links
Discogs entry. Retrieved August 21, 2015.

2012 debut albums
Sucré (band) albums
Music & Arts albums